Rumely may refer to:

 M. Rumely Company, American agricultural equipment manufacturer that was reorganized as Advance-Rumely
 Rumely Oil Pull, a kerosene-powered farm tractor developed by Edward Rumely
 Rumely, Michigan, an unincorporated community in Rock River Township, Alger County

People 
 Edward Rumely (1882–1964), a physician, educator, and newspaper man from Indiana
 Robert Rumely (born 1952), mathematician and co-developer of the Adleman–Pomerance–Rumely primality test